Silver Lake is a hamlet situated on a small lake of the same name in the Town of Pittsfield.  It is located south of Village of New Berlin along the eastern bank of the Unadilla River. 

A former 1920s era race track surrounds the lake and has been turned into a nature sanctuary. The lake has mostly warm-water fish such as blue gill, and bass with abundance of birds, turtles, frogs, etc. Several lots along one-third of the lake have deeded access to the lake. There is also a small neighborhood beach maintained by the area's residents.

Hamlets in Otsego County, New York